Gurab (also Romanized as Gūrāb) is a village in Garizat Rural District, Nir District, Taft County, Yazd Province, Iran. At the 2006 census, its population was 111, in 27 families.

References 

Populated places in Taft County